The Blumenauer Bridge, formally the Congressman Earl Blumenauer Bicycle and Pedestrian Bridge, and previously known as Sullivan's Crossing, is a bicycle and pedestrian bridge in Portland, Oregon. United States. The $19 million project spans Interstate 84 and connects the Lloyd District with Kerns in inner northeast Portland. The bridge was originally slated to open in December 2020, but its projected opening was later postponed to the following spring and subsequently to July 31, 2022, and the bridge did open on that date.

See also

 Bicycle bridge
 Sullivan's Gulch, Portland, Oregon

References

External links

 Congressman Earl Blumenauer Bicycle and Pedestrian Bridge, City of Portland, Oregon

2022 establishments in Oregon
Bridges completed in 2022
Bridges in Portland, Oregon
Cyclist bridges in the United States
Northeast Portland, Oregon
Pedestrian bridges in Oregon